Saint Vincent and the Grenadines is an overwhelmingly Christian majority country, with adherents of Islam being a minuscule minority. Due to secular nature of the country's constitution, Muslims are free to proselytize and build places of worship in the country. 

According to the United States Department of State, Islam is a minority religion in Saint Vincent and the Grenadines, with 2,000 Muslims (approximately 1.5% of the total population) living in the island nation.

References

Religion in Saint Vincent and the Grenadines
Saint Vincent
Saint Vincent